Judge Wilson may refer to:

Billy Roy Wilson (born 1939), judge of the United States District Court for the Eastern District of Arkansas
Charles R. Wilson (judge) (born 1954), judge of the United States Court of Appeals for the Eleventh Circuit
Cory T. Wilson (born 1970), judge of the United States Court of Appeals for the Fifth Circuit
David John Wilson (1887–1976), judge of the United States Customs Court
Frank Wiley Wilson (1917–1982), judge of the United States District Court for the Eastern District of Tennessee
James Clifton Wilson (1874–1951), judge of the United States District Court for the Northern District of Texas
Jennifer P. Wilson (born 1975), judge of the United States District Court for the Middle District of Pennsylvania
Samuel Grayson Wilson (born 1949), judge of the United States District Court for the Western District of Virginia
Scott Wilson (judge) (1870–1942), judge of the United States Court of Appeals for the First Circuit
Sarah L. Wilson (born 1959), judge of the United States Court of Federal Claims
Stephen Victor Wilson (born 1941), judge of the United States District Court for the Central District of California

See also
Hiram V. Willson (1808–1866), judge of the United States District Court for the Northern District of Ohio
Joseph Putnam Willson (1902–1998), judge of the United States District Court for the Western District of Pennsylvania
Justice Wilson (disambiguation)